Shoulder belt may refer to:

Shoulder harness, a seat belt
Shoulder belt (military)
Sash
Baldric